The 1997 Texas Longhorns football team represented the University of Texas at Austin during the 1997 NCAA Division I-A football season. They were represented in the Big 12 Conference in the South Division. They played their home games at Darrell K Royal–Texas Memorial Stadium in Austin, Texas. The team was led by head coach John Mackovic, who was fired after the conclusion of the regular season.

Schedule

Season summary

Rutgers

    
    
    
    
    
    
    
    
    

Ricky Williams 19 Rush, 155 Yds

UCLA

References

Texas
Texas Longhorns football seasons
Texas Longhorns football